KDM Shipping is a holding company based from Cyprus. 

The company consists of the KM Management (Cyprus), the Communal shipping company "Kiev" (based in Kyiv using the Dnieper River and the Black Sea), the "Capital Shipping Company", the Kyiv River Port, the Kherson Shipyard of Kuibyshev.

References

External links 
 KDM Shipping - Official site
 List of ships at the Fleetphoto.ru
 Same list different name at the Fleetphoto.ru
 Another list of the same ships at the Fleetphoto.ru
 List of bankrupted Kyiv Shipping Company at the Fleetphoto.ru (all its ships were transferred to Moscow)

Shipping companies of Ukraine
Companies based in Kyiv